This is a list of visual artists from, or associated, with Indonesia.

A
 Basuki Abdullah (1915-1993), painter
 Affandi (1907–1990), painter
 Kartika Affandi-Koberl (born 1934), artist
 Mochtar Apin (1923-1994), painter and lecturer
 Arahmaiani (born 1961), performance artist
 Avianti Armand (born 1969), artist

B
 Antonio Blanco (1912-1999), Philippine-born Indonesian painter
 Rudolf Bonnet (1895-1978), Dutch-born Indonesian painter

D
 Heri Dono (born 1960), installation artist

F
 Lee Man Fong (1913-1988), painter

G
 Slamet Gundono (1966-2004), artist and puppeteer

I
 Samuel Indratma (born 1970), muralist

J
 Mella Jaarsma (born 1960), textiles
 Marina Joesoef (born 1959), painter

K
 Sudjana Kerton (1922-1994), painter

L
 I Gusti Nyoman Lempad (c.1862-1978), sculptor and architect

M
 Ida Bagus Made (1915-1999), painter
 Nyoman Masriadi (born 1973), painter
 I Nyoman Masriadi (born 1973), Balinese artist and painter
 Yovita Meta (born 1955), fashion designer and craft artist
 Mochtar Apin (1923–1994), painter
 Mangku Muriati (born 1967), painter

N
 I Nyoman Ngendon (1906-1946), painter

P
 J Ariadhitya Pramuhendra (born 1984), painter

R
 Ida Bagus Nyoman Rai (c.1917-2000), painter

S
 Ivan Sagita (born 1957), painter
 Raden Saleh (1811-1880), painter
 Siti Adiyati (born 1951), installation artist and painter
 Arie Smit (1916-2016), Dutch-born Indonesian painter
 Han Snel (1925-1998), Dutch-born Indonesian painter
 Anak Agung Gde Sobrat (1912-1992), painter
 I Ketut Soki (born 1946), painter
 Walter Spies (1895-1942), Russian-born Indonesian painter
 Tjokorda Krishna Putra Sudharsana (born 1956), painter
 Jim Supangkat (born 1948), sculptor and curator

T
 Fiona Tan (born 1966), installation artist
 Tio Tjay (born 1946), painter
 Titarubi (born 1968)
 Ida Bagus Made Togog (1913-1989), painter

U
 Umi Dachlan (1942-2009), painter and lecturer

W
 Made Wianta (born 1949), painter

Y
 Yunizar (born 1971), painter

Artists

Lists of artists by nationality